Chemically Imbalanced is the debut studio album of American rapper Chris Webby. The album was released in stores and on iTunes October 27, 2014. The album featured appearances from Dizzy Wright, Jarren Benton, Tech N9ne, and others.

Background
Webby began to speak about releasing his debut album following the release of his second EP, Homegrown. On September 26, 2014, Webby released album art and a release date for the album. He has also released dates for the Chemically Imbalanced Tour in order to promote the album. On October 1, the album was made available for pre-orders on iTunes.

Promotion
On August 14, Webby announced the release for the album's first single, “F*ck Off”. On August 19, ‘’F*ck Off’’ was released onto iTunes. Pre-orders for Chemically Imbalanced came with the single and another song entitled ‘’R.A.D. (Roll a Doobie)’’. The following three Tuesdays after "R.A.D." was released, three more singles were released, titled "Let's Do It Again", "Dopamine," featuring guest rappers such as Talib Kweli, Grafh, B-Real, and Trae tha Truth, and "Stand Up." On October 23, Billboard streamed the album via SoundCloud.

Commercial performance
The album debuted at number 25 on the Billboard 200, selling 13,000 copies in its first week.

Track listing

Special expanded edition bonus tracks

References 

2014 debut albums